Greg Hollimon (born May 2, 1956) is an American actor best known for his work on Comedy Central's Strangers with Candy.

Hollimon grew up in the Chicago housing projects of Cabrini–Green, growing up alongside Ozone from Breakin'. In 1986, he began taking improvisation classes at The Players Workshop, where he met Paul Dinello and, some time later, Amy Sedaris. Hollimon then began doing stand-up at a few local comedy clubs and dabbled in comedy writing, while honing his craft of improvisation at Players Workshop.

Hollimon graduated from The Players Workshop in 1988 and enrolled in classes at Chicago's famed The Second City. While still taking classes, he was hired into Second City's National Touring Company, where he met Stephen Colbert. A year later, Sedaris, Dinello, Colbert & Hollimon were all touring together, performing nightly improvisational theatre at colleges & universities all over America.

After leaving Second City in 1993, he then wrote and performed in a two-man play called The RIC Show-Revelations, Indictments and Confessions with his friend and fellow actor Michael McCarthy. They performed the play to rave reviews at the Dublin Theater Festival and eventually staged the show in Los Angeles where it garnered similar accolades.

When the play closed, Hollimon returned to Chicago to work in the theater. He performed in plays, including Eugene Lee's East Texas Hot Links and Pearl Cleage's Flying West." He then moved on to film, appearing in Stephen Gyllenhaal's Losing Isaiah and Richard Pearce's A Family Thing.

Sedaris, Dinello, and Colbert created the role of Principal Blackman with Hollimon in mind for the Strangers with Candy TV series. Blackman's deep, oratorial speaking style is actually quite different from Hollimon's actual speaking voice. The second season Strangers DVD contains video of the cast's appearance at The Museum of Television and Radio; during this appearance Colbert imitates Blackman, describing his "hubris and overweening pride." (A line that's actually a Blackman quote about Jerri Blank.) Hollimon objected to the imitation, insisting that he didn't sound like that, but Colbert assured him that he did, to which Hollimon humbly agreed to disagree, although Colbert did not agree to the disagreement. The same DVD also features a commentary track where it is revealed that Hollimon is a very skilled rollerskater, so Sedaris, Dinello, and Colbert incorporated this talent into the show.

References

External links 
 
 Greg Hollimon's radio interview on BLACKOUTpresents: Radio

1956 births
Living people
African-American male actors
Male actors from Chicago
20th-century American male actors
21st-century American male actors
20th-century African-American people
21st-century African-American people